The Raven is a 1963 American comedy gothic horror film produced and directed by Roger Corman. The film stars Vincent Price, Peter Lorre, and Boris Karloff as a trio of rival sorcerers. The supporting cast includes Jack Nicholson as the son of Lorre's character.

It was the fifth in the so-called Corman-Poe cycle of eight films largely featuring adaptations of Edgar Allan Poe stories produced by Roger Corman and released by American International Pictures (AIP). The film was written by Richard Matheson, based on references to Poe's 1845 poem "The Raven". AIP released the film as a double feature with Night Tide.

Three decades earlier, Karloff had appeared in another film with the same title, Lew Landers's 1935 horror film The Raven with Bela Lugosi.

Plot
In the year 1506, the sorcerer Dr. Erasmus Craven has been mourning the death of his wife Lenore for over two years, much to the dismay of his daughter, Estelle. One night he is visited by a raven, who happens to be a transformed wizard, Dr. Bedlo. Together they brew a potion that restores Bedlo to his old self. Bedlo explains that he had been transformed by the evil Dr. Scarabus in an unfair duel, and both decide to see Scarabus, Bedlo to exact revenge and Craven to look for his wife's ghost, which Bedlo reportedly saw at Scarabus' castle. After fighting off an attack by Craven's coachman, who acted under the influence of Scarabus, they are joined by Craven's daughter Estelle and Bedlo's son Rexford, and set out to the castle.

At the castle, Scarabus greets his guests with false friendship, and Bedlo is apparently killed as he conjures a storm in an act of defiance. At night, however, Rexford finds Bedlo alive and well, hiding in the castle. Craven, meanwhile, is visited and tormented by Lenore, who is revealed to be alive and well too, having faked her death two years before to become Scarabus' mistress. As Craven, Estelle, Rexford and Bedlo try to escape from the castle, Scarabus stops them, and they are imprisoned. Bedlo panics and begs Scarabus to turn him back into a raven rather than torture him. He then flees the dungeon by flying away. Craven is forced to choose between surrendering his magical secrets to Scarabus or watching his daughter be tortured. Bedlo secretly returns and frees Rexford, and together they aid Craven.

Craven and Scarabus sit facing each other, and engage in a magic duel. After a series of attacks, counterattacks and insults, during which Scarabus sets the castle on fire, Craven defeats Scarabus. Lenore tries to reconcile with him, claiming that she had been bewitched by Scarabus, but Craven rejects her. Craven, Bedlo, Estelle and Rexford escape just as the castle collapses on Scarabus and his mistress; both survive but Scarabus‘ magic is gone.

In the final scene, Bedlo, still a raven, tries to convince Craven to restore him to human form. Craven tells him to shut his beak, and says, to camera, "Quoth the raven – nevermore."

Cast
 Vincent Price as Dr. Erasmus Craven
 Peter Lorre as Dr. Adolphus Bedlo
 Boris Karloff as Dr. Scarabus
 Hazel Court as Lenore Craven
 Olive Sturgess as Estelle Craven
 Jack Nicholson as Rexford Bedlo
 Connie Wallace as Maid
 William Baskin as Grimes
 Aaron Saxon as Gort

Production

Script
Roger Corman and Richard Matheson had both enjoyed making the comic "The Black Cat" episode of Tales of Terror and wanted to try an entirely comic Poe feature.

"After I heard they wanted to make a movie out of a poem, I felt that was an utter joke, so comedy was really the only way to go with it", said Matheson.

Shooting
The film was shot in 15 days.

Roger Corman said that although they kept closely to the structure and story script, "We did more improvisation on that film than any of the others." The improvisation was in terms of dialogue and bits of business from the actors.

During shooting, Peter Lorre ad-libbed a number of famous lines in the film including:
 "How the hell should I know?", after Vincent Price asks "shall I ever see the rare and radiant Lenore again?"
 "Where else?" after Vincent Price says "I keep her here." (referring to the body of his lost love Lenore, kept in a coffin in the hall)
 "Hard place to keep clean."
Roger Corman says that Lorre's improvisations confused both Vincent Price and Boris Karloff, but Price adapted to it well while Karloff struggled. Corman:
Overall I would say we had as good a spirit on The Raven as any film I've ever worked on, except for a couple of moments with Boris. There was a slight edge to it, because Boris came in with a carefully worked out preparation, so when Peter started improvising lines, it really threw Boris off from his preparation. 
Corman says the tension between Peter Lorre and Jack Nicholson as father and son came from the actors rather than the script; the two did not get along well.

Vincent Price later recalled about the final duel:
Boris hated being strung up in the air on those chairs. He was terribly crippled, and we were both floating in the air on these wires. It wasn't a pleasant feeling! And I hated having that snake wrapped around my neck for two hours... I hate snakes.
Boris Karloff later said he was annoyed at having to wear the heavy cape.

The scene of the burning interior of the castle was reused film from Corman's 1960 film House of Usher.

Release

Critical reception
Bosley Crowther of The New York Times panned the film as "comic-book nonsense ... Strickly (sic) a picture for the kiddies and the bird-brained, quote the critic." Variety wrote that while Poe "might turn over in his crypt at this nonsensical adaptation of his immortal poem", Corman nevertheless "takes this premise and develops it expertly as a horror-comedy." The Chicago Tribune called it "fairly thin fare, made up mostly of camera tricks, and some very obviously false scenery, but Peter Lorre's performance is mildly entertaining. Youngsters may find it fun." A generally positive review in The Monthly Film Bulletin wrote that the film "starts off with the inestimable advantage of a script which not only makes it amply clear from the outset that [Corman] is cheerfully and wholeheartedly sending himself up, but manages to do it wittily." Its main criticism was a "long central section" of the film that drags until things pick up again for the final duel. Peter John Dyer of Sight & Sound wrote, "Richard Matheson's script, a good deal more tenuous than its predecessors in the Corman-Poe canon, at least treats its actors generously to props, incantations and quotable lines ... A pity the equation doesn't always add up; there's too much slack, due perhaps to an imbalance between the comedy, which runs riot, and the horror, which trails behind in the wake of previous Corman films."

Colin Greenland reviewed The Raven for Imagine magazine, and stated that "Not so much a raven, more a bit of a lark."

On Rotten Tomatoes the film has an approval rating of 88% based on reviews from 17 critics, with an average rating of 6.8 out of 10.

Shown on the MeTV show Svengoolie on January 7, 2022.

Box office
The film was popular at the box office.

In France it had admissions of 106,292.

Novelization
A novelization of the film was written by Eunice Sudak adapted from Richard Matheson's screenplay and published by Lancer Books in paperback. This novel was republished by Bear Manor Media in 2012.

Comic book adaptation
 Dell Movie Classic: The Raven (September 1963)

See also
 List of American films of 1963

References

External links
 
 
 
 

1963 films
1960s English-language films
1960s comedy horror films
1960s fantasy comedy films
1963 horror films
American comedy horror films
American International Pictures films
Films based on The Raven
Films directed by Roger Corman
Films set in the Middle Ages
Gothic horror films
Films with screenplays by Richard Matheson
Films produced by Roger Corman
Films scored by Les Baxter
Films set in castles
Films adapted into comics
1960s historical films
American historical films
1963 comedy films
1960s American films